Talebi may refer to:

People
Talebi (surname)

Places
Talebi, Khoshab, a village in Khoshab County, Razavi Khorasan Province, Iran
Talebi, Nishapur, a village in Nishapur County, Razavi Khorasan Province, Iran